Almost Unplugged is a live album by the Swedish hard rock band Europe. It was released on CD on 17 September 2008 and on DVD on 19 August 2009.

The album was recorded at Nalen, a venue in Stockholm on 26 January 2008. The band was accompanied by a string quartet and played reworked versions of its own songs, as well as cover versions of songs by bands that have influenced Europe's sound over the years – Pink Floyd, UFO, Led Zeppelin and Thin Lizzy.  The album debuted on the Swedish Album Chart at number 26, and went to number 23 the following week.

The album is dedicated to Michelle Meldrum, John Norum's late wife, who died on 21 May 2008.

Track listing
"Got to Have Faith" (Joey Tempest, John Norum) – 4:15
"Forever Travelling" (Tempest, Mic Michaeli) – 4:22
"Devil Sings the Blues" (Tempest, Michaeli) – 6:26
"Wish You Were Here" (David Gilmour, Roger Waters) – 4:36
"Dreamer" (Tempest) – 4:23
"Love to Love" (Phil Mogg, Michael Schenker) – 7:31
"The Final Countdown" (Tempest) – 5:46
"Yesterday's News" (Tempest, Kee Marcello, John Levén, Ian Haugland, Michaeli) – 6:30
"Since I've Been Lovin' You" (Jimmy Page, Robert Plant, John Paul Jones) – 7:24
"Hero" (Tempest) – 4:26
"Suicide" (Phil Lynott) – 5:42
"Memories" (Tempest) – 5:51
"Superstitious" (Tempest) – 4:39
"Rock the Night" (Tempest)  – 5:51

Personnel
Joey Tempest – lead vocals, acoustic guitar
John Norum – electric & acoustic guitars
John Levén – bass guitar, acoustic guitar
Mic Michaeli – keyboards, backing vocals
Ian Haugland – drums, backing vocals
Malin-My Nilsson – violin, string arrangements
Victoria Lundell – violin
Jonna Inge – viola
Anna Landberg Dager – cello
Andreas Bauman – mixing
Henrik Jonsson – mastering
Staffan Lindahl – tour manager / production manager
Ronny "Rompa" Bernström – live sound engineer
Anders "Q-lan" Wallertz – lighting designer
Samuel "Samme" Nielsen – monitor engineer
Peter "Peter" Erixon – backline tech
Roger "Spy-T" Albinsson – backline tech
Thomas Eijerstam – technical manager
Fredrik Martinsson – web sound engineer
Gundars Rullis – FOH technician
Tindra Jonsson Wibers – co-ordinator
Dimitrios Dimitriadis – cover design

References

Europe (band) albums
Europe (band) video albums
2009 video albums
Live video albums
2008 live albums
2000s English-language films